Rafael Amirbekov (born 23 February 1976, in Qusar) is a retired Azerbaijani professional footballer who last played for FK Baku. He is a defender.

Playing career 
On 27 August 2009 Amirbekov played for FK Baku in their 5–1 defeat to FC Basel in the Europa League.

Amirbekov is the captain of FK Baku.

National team statistics

Honours
FC Baku
 Azerbaijan Premier League: 2005–06

References

External links
 Profile on FK Baku Official Site
 

1976 births
Living people
Azerbaijani footballers
Azerbaijani expatriate footballers
Expatriate footballers in Iran
Azerbaijan international footballers
Azerbaijan Premier League players
FC Baku players
Tractor S.C. players
People from Qusar
Association football defenders